This is a list of Monuments of National Importance (ASI) as officially recognized by and available through the website of the Archaeological Survey of India in the Indian state Maharashtra. The monument identifier is a combination of the abbreviation of the subdivision of the list (state, ASI circle) and the numbering as published on the website of the ASI. 286 monuments of National Importance have been recognized by the ASI in Maharashtra.
 
Maharashtra is subdivided in three circles:

 Aurangabad circle
 Mumbai circle
 Nagpur circle

See also
 List of Monuments of National Importance in India for other Monuments of National Importance in India
 List of State Protected Monuments in Maharashtra

References

External links 

 

Maharashtra
Monuments of National Importance
Monuments of National Importance
Monuments of National Importance